A Soldier Speaks after Death (병사는 죽어서 말한다 - Byeonsaneun jukeoseo malhanda) is a 1966 South Korean film directed by Kim Ki-young.

Plot
It is a war film about a soldier who plants flower seeds before leaving for his military service. After he is killed in combat, the flowers bloom.

Cast
 Hwang Jung-seun 
 Sunwoo Yong-nyeo
 Shin Young-kyun
 Kim Seok-gang
 Kim Seung-ho
 Twist Kim
 Joo Sun-tae
 Park Am
 Jeon Chang-keun
 Kim Yong-yeon

Bibliography

References

External links 
 
 

1966 films
1960s Korean-language films
South Korean war drama films
Films directed by Kim Ki-young